This is a listing of Australian rules footballers who made their senior debut for a Victorian Football League (VFL) club in 1914.

1914 was 's final season in the VFL.

Summary

Debuts

References

Australian rules football records and statistics
Australian rules football-related lists
1914 in Australian rules football